Brian McDonough (born August 16, 1965) is an American cyclist. He competed in the men's points race at the 1996 Summer Olympics.

References

External links
 

1965 births
Living people
American male cyclists
Olympic cyclists of the United States
Cyclists at the 1996 Summer Olympics
Sportspeople from Winston-Salem, North Carolina